Fousseni Bamba (born 19 April 1990) is an Ivorian-born Guinean professional footballer who plays as a centre back for Stade Beaucairois. His younger brother, Yacouba, is also a footballer.

References

External links

1990 births
Living people
Association football central defenders
People from Bingerville
Citizens of Guinea through descent
Guinean footballers
Guinea international footballers
Ivorian footballers
Ivory Coast under-20 international footballers
Ivorian people of Guinean descent
Sportspeople of Guinean descent
Ivorian expatriate footballers
Ivorian expatriate sportspeople in Hungary
Ivorian expatriate sportspeople in Romania
Ivorian expatriate sportspeople in France
Ivorian expatriate sportspeople in Cyprus
Ivorian expatriate sportspeople in Ukraine
Guinean expatriate sportspeople in Ukraine
Guinean expatriate sportspeople in Hungary
ES Viry-Châtillon players
ACF Gloria Bistrița players
Ayia Napa FC players
FC Slutsk players
FC Zugdidi players
FC Chornomorets Odesa players
Budapest Honvéd FC players
NK Rudar Velenje players
Stade Beaucairois players
Cypriot First Division players
Ukrainian Premier League players
Expatriate footballers in Hungary
Expatriate footballers in France
Expatriate footballers in Romania
Expatriate footballers in Cyprus
Expatriate footballers in Belarus
Expatriate footballers in Georgia (country)
Expatriate footballers in Ukraine
Expatriate footballers in Slovenia